Chetham is an English surname originating from the place name Cheetham near Manchester, Lancashire. Variants include Cheetham, Cheatham, Chatan, Chitham, and Chitson. One early Chetham family was from Moston, Manchester in the Middle Ages.

People 

 Humphrey Chetham (1580–1653), English merchant and philanthropist

See also 

 Chetham's Hospital and Library, Manchester, founded by Humphrey Chetham in 1653:
 Chetham's School of Music
 Chetham's Library
 Chetham Society
 Cheetham, Manchester
 Cheetham (disambiguation)
 Cheetham (surname)
 Cheatham (disambiguation)
 Cheatham (surname)
 Chitham

References 

Surnames